Súlur is a mountain located to the south west of the town Akureyri in Iceland rising some 1213 meters. It is popular for hiking tours.

References

Mountains of Iceland
North Iceland
One-thousanders of Iceland